All clear is the signal, generally given by a civil defence siren, which indicates that an air raid or other hazard has finished and that it is safe for civilians to leave their shelters; it is commonly used in radios as well.

United Kingdom
During the First World War, the Metropolitan Police introduced their first air raid warning system in London in 1917, which consisted of police officers detonating maroons (a type of loud firework) and the "all clear" was sounded by Boy Scout buglers.

Immediately before the Second World War, a network of sirens had been established in towns across the United Kingdom; the "alert" was given by a rising and falling tone and the "all clear" by a continuous tone. The sirens remained in place during the Cold War but instead of being the responsibility of local police forces, the alarms were activated by the United Kingdom Warning and Monitoring Organisation. Following an air raid, the "all clear" would only be sounded if no nuclear weapons had been used, or when any nuclear fallout was deemed by the Royal Observer Corps to have reached safe levels, which might have been up to two weeks later. The system was discontinued in 1992.

Other countries (using an All-Clear signal on their warning sirens) 
The following is a list of countries that use All Clear on sirens:

 Denmark
 Singapore
 Kuwait
 U.S. (some areas)
 Afghanistan (for instance, Kandahar)
 Canada
 Israel

Other countries (not using an All-Clear signal on their warning sirens) 

 Netherlands
 South Korea
 China
 U.S. (some areas)

References

Civil defense
Emergency population warning systems